San Antonino El Alto is a town and municipality in Oaxaca in southwestern Mexico. The municipality covers an area of 65.07 km². It is part of the Zimatlán District in the west of the Valles Centrales Region.

In 2005, the municipality had a population of 2,445.

El Alto Zapotec is spoken in the town.

References

Municipalities of Oaxaca